Alan West Corson Homestead is a historic house located in Whitemarsh Township, Montgomery County, Pennsylvania.  It was built in three sections between 1734 and 1820.  It is a -story, stuccoed stone dwelling, six bays wide and two bays deep. It has a -story rear ell.  Also on the property is a contributing smoke house.  The property was used for one of the earliest area nurseries and a boarding school.

Abolitionism
Grandson Alan Wright Corson (1788–1882) and his family were Quakers and abolitionists. He was one of the founders of the Montgomery County Anti-Slavery Society (1837), and turned the house into a station on the Underground Railroad. His brother George built nearby Abolition Hall as a meeting place for anti-slavery groups.

It was added to the National Register of Historic Places in 1973.  It is located in the Cold Point Historic District.

Notes

References

Houses on the National Register of Historic Places in Pennsylvania
Houses completed in 1820
Houses in Montgomery County, Pennsylvania
National Register of Historic Places in Montgomery County, Pennsylvania
Houses on the Underground Railroad
Individually listed contributing properties to historic districts on the National Register in Pennsylvania
Underground Railroad in Pennsylvania